NASCAR driver St. James Davis and his wife LaDonna Davis had a pet chimpanzee named Moe, whom they treated as if he were a human child. After Moe bit several people, the city of West Covina, California seized the primate and placed him in an animal sanctuary near Bakersfield, California. The Davises waged a long, unsuccessful legal battle to recover Moe. 

On March 3, 2005, while at the sanctuary on one of their frequent visits with Moe, St. James and LaDonna Davis were attacked by two young male chimpanzees, Buddy and Ollie, who had escaped their enclosures. LaDonna Davis lost her thumb, and St. James Davis was brutally mauled, resulting in permanent disfigurement and missing extremities.

Background

The Davises had adopted Moe in 1967, not long after his birth in Tanzania. Moe was an orphan: Tanzanian poachers had killed Moe's mother when he was one day old and the couple did not have any children, so they raised Moe as their own. The chimpanzee lived with them in their home, wore clothes, was toilet trained, and took showers. Moe participated in their wedding; LaDonna Davis said Moe acted as a "a combination of flower-thrower and best man". 

In 1977, when Moe was 10 years old, he bit a woman, injuring her finger. A lawsuit followed, but the case was dismissed.

On August 16, 1998, Moe escaped. The Davises claimed that Moe had been frightened by an electric shock that occurred while his cage was being repaired. Local police were called, and several officers were required to restrain Moe. While resisting recapture, Moe dented a police vehicle and mauled a police officer's hand. The police officer required medical treatment and subsequent rehabilitation costing .

On September 2, 1999, a visitor came to see Moe. The Davises claim that they warned the woman not to attempt to approach Moe's cage, but she extended her hand into his cage. Moe bit her. The Davises claimed that the woman wore red polish on her fingernails, and Moe may have mistaken them for his favorite licorice. The woman sued, and the Davises settled the lawsuit.

West Covina officials seized Moe and relocated him to an animal sanctuary. The Davises fought to regain custody of the chimpanzee, but were unsuccessful. In 2002, the Davises filed a civil rights lawsuit against West Covina, California; the  city ultimately agreed to pay the Davises  plus  for a home purchase in nearby Baldwin Park, California, where they could live with Moe.

Attack
The Davises visited Moe regularly at the animal sanctuary. In 2003 the animal sanctuary experienced licensing problems, so Moe was transferred to Animal Haven Ranch, near Bakersfield, California. Animal Haven was a  nonprofit sanctuary that housed six primates.

On March 3, 2005, the Davises came to Animal Haven Ranch to celebrate Moe's 39th birthday. The couple brought Moe a birthday cake and were seated at a picnic table next to Moe's enclosure. The couple brought toys, candy hearts, chocolate milk, and a raspberry-filled sheet cake for the birthday party. LaDonna Davis said the chimp clapped his hands with joy when he saw them. She cut a piece of cake for the chimp and then when she went to cut a second piece she noticed a chimp had gotten out of its cage. That chimp rushed her and bit off her thumb. St. James pushed LaDonna under the table to protect her. A second chimp was also loose. The two young chimpanzees involved in the attack were named Buddy and Ollie. Two female chimpanzees named Susie and Bones also escaped their cages during the attack; they were not involved in the assault on the Davises and were recaptured five hours later. Moe did not participate in the attack. 

Buddy and Ollie attacked St. James simultaneously; one chimp initially attacked St. James's face, the other attacked his foot. The sanctuary owner's son-in-law, Mark Carruthers, retrieved a 45-caliber revolver and shot Buddy in the head. Meanwhile, Ollie dragged St. James's body down a walkway. Carruthers followed and killed Ollie by gunshot.

The chimpanzees destroyed a majority of St. James's fingers, his left foot, most of his buttocks, both testicles, part of his torso, and parts of his face including his nose and his lips. A paramedic who arrived said, “It looked like a grizzly bear attack.” St. James was transported to Loma Linda University Medical Center after the attack.

Aftermath
St. James spent six months in a hospital recovering from the attack, including a period of time when he was in a coma. Between 2005 and 2009, St. James Davis underwent over 60 surgeries. He has a glass eye and two slits in the middle of his face where his nose once was. The Davises were uninsured, but decided not to sue Animal Haven. 

In 2006, the year following the attack, the Davises placed a sign in their front yard that read "Free Moe". They also went to Superior Court in Pomona, California to get the city of West Covina to honor their 2002 settlement which required the city to purchase a home for them in Baldwin Park, California so that they could reunite with their chimpanzee Moe. In 2007, the court ruled that West Covina should pay the Davises  because the city did not fulfill their obligations under the 2002 settlement, pay the Davises $300 per month towards covering the costs of Moe's housing, and covering travel expenses for their visits to Moe.

Moe disappeared in the summer of 2008. Moe had been living at a ranch for performing animals, Jungle Exotics, in San Bernardino. Construction workers reported they had seen Moe at a home near Jungle Exotics; other witnesses spotted him heading toward a mountain. The Davises hired a helicopter to do flyovers in an attempt to flush Moe out of hiding, and authorities searched the San Bernardino National Forest, but the 42-year-old chimpanzee has never been found.

See also
 List of individual apes

References

External links
 YouTube Video - St James tells the story of Moe (2009)

Primate attacks
History of Kern County, California
2005 in California
March 2005 events in the United States
Chimpanzees